The Cat (lit. "The Cat: Eyes that See Death") is a 2011 South Korean horror film directed by Byun Seung-wook. The film is about So-yeon (Park Min-young), who works at a small pet-grooming shop called Kitty N Puppy. So-yeon has claustrophobia and starts having apparitions of a ghostly young girl with cat-like eyes (Kim Ye-ron).

Plot
So-yeon is a kind woman who works as a groomer in a pet shop called Kitty N Puppy, but has claustrophobia due to childhood trauma. A woman comes to the pet shop to collect her Persian cat, Bidanyi, one day, after one of Bidanyi's lengthy checkups at the pet shop. The next day, the woman is found dead in an elevator, but Bidanyi is unharmed. The police are unable to determine the cause of her death. So-yeon's friend Kim Jun-seok, one of the police officers investigating the murder, gives her Bidanyi to look after, since she has already had experience with animals.

So-yeon starts to have nightmares of a young girl with cat-like eyes and is haunted by hallucinations. Jun-seok and his fellow officers watch CCTV footage of the woman who died and it's concluded that she died of a panic attack. So-yeon's friend Bo-hee, who recently adopted a cat, dies of a similar cause. That night, So-yeon cuts her finger while preparing food for Bidanyi. Bidanyi licks the blood and becomes aggressive. So-yeon, terrified, takes the cat to the dead woman's husband, but he does not want him. He explains that his wife claimed to be haunted by a strange little girl after buying Bidanyi. Disturbed, So-yeon leaves Bidanyi in a park. At the animal shelter, a staff member cremates a dead cat, but is pulled inside the furnace by an unseen force and burns to death.

Jun-seok and So-yeon go to the animal shelter, where they find dead cats and the charred remains of the staff member. They learn that some time ago, there was an infestation of stray cats in the boiler room of an apartment complex. The doors and windows were cemented shut and the cats were left to suffocate. Two weeks later, workers removed the dead cats. So-yeon remarks the similarity of the murder victims all being found dead in a small space. She is again approached by a confused old woman she had encountered before, who is looking for her granddaughter. Jun-seok discovers that the old woman reported her missing granddaughter nine months ago, but her son closed the case. So-yeon escorts the woman back to her apartment - in the same complex where the stray cats lived in the boiler room - and Jun-seok gives her a photo of the granddaughter, who looks exactly like the cat-eyed girl So-yeon had seen in her hallucinations, the same one the dead woman had complained of seeing. So-yeon sees the old woman's son beating his mother; he is then killed by a horde of cats.

So-yeon goes to the complex's boiler room and is confronted by cats. While trying to fight off the hoarde, including Bidanyi, So-yeon falls into a large canister. The cat-eyed girl appears and shows her how she died; she had played with the cats in the boiler room, and upon hearing of the plans to kill them, she attempted to hide them in the canister. While climbing out, she fell and was paralyzed, dying with the cats after the door and windows were cemented. The girl also has a special relationship with those who have cats, and it is actually the restless spirits of the cats who have murdered the others. The girl convinces the cats to stop and they let So-yeon go free.

Having conquered her claustrophobia, So-yeon visits her father in a mental hospital, riding in an elevator for the first time without panicking. As she leaves, she and Ju-seok find a kitten underneath their car, and she kindly beckons toward it.

Cast

Park Min-young as So-yeon
Kim Ye-ron as Hee-jin
Kim Dong-wook as Jun-seok
Shin Da-eun as Bo-hee
Lee Sang-hee as animal pound doctor
Jo Seok-hyun as Park Joo-im
Park Hyun-young as Kim Soon-kyung
Baek Soo-ryun as grandmother with dementia
Lee Han-wi as pet shop owner
Lee Joong-ok as Police chief Lee
Seo Yi-sook as psychiatrist
Lee Ji-hyun as veterinarian
Kim Min-jae as animal rescue staff
Jo Han-hee as women's association head
Song Moon-soo as manager
Lee Jung-gu as asylum doctor
Kim Gye-seon as asylum receptionist
Kim Ik-tae as So-yeon's father
Lee Cheol-min as son of demented grandmother
Lee Sung-min as Bidan's "papa"
Yoon Ga-hyun as Bidan's "mom"

Release
The Cat premiered in South Korea on July 7, 2011.

Box office
On its opening week, it grossed  in South Korea, placing it at second place on the weekend box office chart.

Critical reception
Film Business Asia gave the film a 5/10 review, saying it is "almost a paint-by-numbers example of a classic Korean horror...The Cat is a watchable curio and no more."

References

External links
 
 
 

2011 horror films
South Korean horror films
Next Entertainment World films
2010s Korean-language films
2011 films
2010s South Korean films